Armando de Sequeira Romeu is a Cuban musical director, composer, arranger, violinist, drummer and bassist. He is best known for his association with the Orquesta Cubana de Música Moderna, an Afro-Cuban jazz ensemble which spawned various successful groups such as Irakere.

Life and career
As a teenager, he played drums with the Marines Orchestra, conducted by his grandfather Armando Romeu. As a young director, he created the groups Los Fantásticos and Los Cinco de Armando Sequeira, and he discovered singer Maggie Carlés. In 1972 he co-founded Irakere, one of Cuba's best-known Latin jazz bands, together with pianist Chucho Valdés. However, he was not a member of the band.

Family
Armando de Sequeira Romeu is a member of the Romeu family, which includes many musicians who achieved fame in Cuba, primarily as pianists, musical directors, composers and arrangers. His grandfather Armando Romeu Marrero was the music director for the Banda de Música de la Marina de Guerra de Cuba (the Cuban marine band) for more than sixty years. His great uncle, Antonio María Romeu Marrero, was one of the most popular danzón composers and charanga bandleaders in Cuba. His mother, Zenaida Romeu González, known as a pianist and a composer, performed for the Havana Symphony Orchestra and worked at her father's radio station, CMBN.

His uncle Armando Romeu Jr., a jazz musician and the nephew of one of Cuba's early classical composers, was the bandleader who was asked by Víctor de Correa to assemble the house orchestra for the Tropicana Club. In 1954, de Sequeira, joined his uncle's orchestra as a drummer performing at the Tropicana Club and recorded with Nat King Cole the album Cole Español.

References

Living people
Cuban conductors (music)
Cuban jazz percussionists
Cuban bassists
Year of birth missing (living people)